NorthEast United FC is an Indian professional football club based in Guwahati, Assam. The club was founded on 13 April 2014 during the inaugural season of Indian Super League. NorthEast United represent the 8 states of India known as North East India which consist Assam, Nagaland, Manipur, Meghalaya, Sikkim, Arunachal Pradesh, Tripura and Mizoram.

Key 

Key to colours and symbols:

Key to league record:
 Season = The year and article of the season
 Finals = Final position
 SF = Semi-finals
 RU = Runners-up
 C = Champions
 Pld = Matches played
 W = Matches won
 D = Matches drawn
 L = Matches lost
 GF = Goals scored
 GA = Goals against
 Pts = Point

Key to cup record:
 En-dash (–) = NorthEast United did not participate or cup not held
 GS = Group stage
 R32 = Round of 32
 R16 = Round of 16
 QF = Quarter-finals
 SF = Semi-finals
 RU = Runners-up
 C = Champions

Seasons

References

External links 
 

 NorthEast United FC seasons
NorthEast United FC
NorthEast United FC
Seasons